Siegfriedia is a monotypic genus of flowering plants belonging to the family Rhamnaceae. The only species is Siegfriedia darwinioides.

Its native range is Western Australia.

References

Rhamnaceae
Rhamnaceae genera
Monotypic Rosales genera